Brent Adams (born October 2, 1990 in Norwalk, Connecticut) is a professional lacrosse player for the Atlas Lacrosse Club of the Premier Lacrosse League and the New York Riptide of the National Lacrosse League. Adams was an All-American midfielder at Fairfield University and played for the United States men's national lacrosse team.

College
Adams attended Fairfield University where he was a 2012 All-American selection and two time All-ECAC First Team selection following the 2011 and 2012 seasons. During his career, Adams started 40 of 53 games, recorded 100 points (68 goals, 32 assists), collected 92 ground balls and forced 27 turnovers.

Professional
Adams was the 53rd pick of the 2012 Major League Lacrosse Collegiate Draft by the Chesapeake Bayhawks. During the 2012 MLL season, he was a member of the Chesapeake Bayhawks team that won the Steinfeld Cup and the MLL Championship.
 
Adams subsequently was acquired by the Boston Cannons on Sept 23, 2012 in a trade with the Chesapeake Bayhawks. As a member of the Boston Cannons, he was selected twice to play in the 2015 MLL All-Star Game in Houston, Texas and the 2016 MLL All-Star Game in Fullerton, California.

After the 2016 MLL season, Adams engaged in the new MLL Player Movement Policy and signed with the Denver Outlaws.

Adams also signed a two-year free agent agreement with the Colorado Mammoth of the National Lacrosse League on September 15, 2016.

On October 22, 2018 it was announced that Adams was joining the Premier Lacrosse League for the summer 2019 season. On March 4, 2019 it was announced that Adams was joining the Redwoods Lacrosse Club. In 5 appearances this season, Adams has 6 goals, 1 assist, 6 ground balls and 1 caused turnover.

On August 3, 2020, Adams signed a one year contract with the New York Riptide in NLL.

Adams was selected by Cannons Lacrosse Club in the 2021 PLL Expansion Draft, however, he would be traded by Cannons to Atlas in exchange for a fourth round pick in the 2022 College Draft less than three weeks later.

Team USA
Adams was selected to play for the United States men's national lacrosse team in an exhibition game September 11, 2016 as part of the US Lacrosse Grand Opening celebration weekend.

Career Stats

MLL

NLL

PLL

References

External links
Colorado Mammoth profile
Denver Outlaws profile
Fairfield Stags profile

Living people
1990 births
Sportspeople from Norwalk, Connecticut
Lacrosse players from Connecticut
Fairfield Stags men's lacrosse players
Major League Lacrosse players
Premier Lacrosse League players
Denver Outlaws players
Colorado Mammoth players
Boston Cannons players
Chesapeake Bayhawks players